Kelch-like protein 18 is a protein that in humans is encoded by the KLHL18 gene.

Model organisms 

Model organisms have been used in the study of KLHL18 function. A conditional knockout mouse line called Klhl18tm1a(KOMP)Wtsi was generated at the Wellcome Trust Sanger Institute. Male and female animals underwent a standardized phenotypic screen to determine the effects of deletion. Additional screens performed:  - In-depth immunological phenotyping

References

Further reading 

 
 
 
 

Kelch proteins